Hayfield railway station was the terminus of the  Hayfield branch from New Mills Central station in Derbyshire, England.

History

Hayfield station opened to passengers on 1 March 1868. The branch and station became the joint property of the Manchester, Sheffield & Lincolnshire Railway (later Great Central) and the Midland Railway. It remained a joint station, latterly owned by the London and North Eastern Railway and the London Midland Scottish Railway, until nationalisation of the railways in 1948.

The branch was assigned subsequently to the London Midland Region of British Railways. Introduction of diesel multiple unit (DMU) trains led to an improvement in passenger services and, by the late 1950s, there was an hourly frequency to and from Manchester London Road (later Piccadilly), with some additional trains at peak times. Unlike some neighbouring lines, the station also enjoyed an hourly Sunday service which was popular with walkers.

In common with most other branch lines, goods traffic dwindled after the Second World War and services were withdrawn on 15 April 1963. Passenger traffic continued until their withdrawal on 5 January 1970; the final trains ran on Saturday 3 January 1970.

The station site was completely cleared in the 1970s, when Derbyshire County Council converted the old trackbed into the Sett Valley Trail. This bridleway runs from Hayfield (the stretch to Birch Vale is part of the Pennine Bridleway) to just north of St.George's Road in New Mills. From there, extensive remodelling of earthworks and redevelopment makes it difficult to recognise the old trackbed, but it can be followed along what is now a footpath to just short of the disused tunnel leading to New Mills Central station.

Timetables

References

Disused railway stations in Derbyshire
Former Great Central and Midland Joint Railway stations
Railway stations in Great Britain opened in 1868
Railway stations in Great Britain closed in 1970
Beeching closures in England